The 2003 St. George Illawarra Dragons season was the fifth in the joint venture club's history. The Dragons competed in the NRL's 2003 premiership season. The team finished tenth in the regular season, missing out on finals for the second time in their history.

Squad gains and losses

Ladder

Ladder Progression

Season results

References 

St. George Illawarra Dragons
St. George Illawarra Dragons seasons
2003 in rugby league by club